The Consulate-General of Russia in New York City is the diplomatic mission of the Russian Federation in New York City. Opened in 1994, the consulate is located at 9 East 91st Street in the former John Henry Hammond House in the Upper East Side of Manhattan.  A consulate of the former Soviet Union had previously existed on East 61st Street from 1933 until 1948.

The house

The house was built in 1903 by John H. Hammond, a New York City banker. The five-story Renaissance style limestone townhouse was designed by Carrère and Hastings, who were also responsible for the design of the New York Public Library Main Branch, and is regarded as one of their finest residences. The ground floor has pronounced banded rustication, while the other floors contain progressively smaller windows.

1933–1948
In 1933 the United States extended diplomatic recognition to the Soviet Union, and on 21 April 1934 the Soviets opened a consulate-general in New York City at 7–9 East 61st Street.

On 31 July 1948, Oksana Kasenkina, a Soviet citizen and a teacher to the children of diplomats of the Soviet mission to the United Nations, appealed to the editor of a Russian-language newspaper in New York City for refuge, and arrangements were made to take Kasenkina to Reed Farm in Valley Cottage, which was operated by the White Russian Tolstoy Foundation. Whilst at the Farm, Kasenkina wrote a letter to Soviet Consul-General Jacob Lomakin ending: "I implore you, I implore you once more, don't let me perish here. I am without willpower." On 7 August Lomakin with vice-consul Chepurnykh arrived at the farm. According to Tolstoy Foundation President Mrs. Alexandra Tolstaya, Kasenkina "at her own free will" went with them to the consulate. On 9 August, Soviet Ambassador to the United States Alexander Panyushkin presented a letter of protest to the United States Department of State, alleging that Kasenkina had been kidnapped and held against her will by members of the Tolstoy Foundation. On 11 August, Vyacheslav Molotov handed a protest note to United States Ambassador to the Soviet Union Walter Bedell Smith, in which the accusations were repeated.

Following the atmosphere in which the New York City press accused the Soviets of holding Kasenkina against her will, on 11 August New York Supreme Court Justice Samuel Dickstein issued a writ of habeas corpus on Consul-General Lomakin, demanding that he present Kasenkina the following day in court. The same day a Soviet consular official stated that Lomakin would not be presenting Kasenkina, and the following morning Ambassador Panyushkin presented the State Department with a note disputing the legalities of the writ under international law. A State Department legal adviser wrote to Governor of New York Thomas E. Dewey, outlining the Soviet complaints and urged Justice Dickstein to take the case under advisement. Shortly afterward Justice Dickstein reserved decision in the proceedings.

On the day of Dickstein's decision, 12 August, the affair took a different turn when Kasenkina jumped from the third-story window of the East 61st Street consulate. Rescued by two police officers, she was brought to a hospital to be treated for injuries sustained in the fall. "Asked by a police detective why she had jumped, some six hours after the event, Kasenkina's reply indicated a stronger desire for deliverance than for asylum. Naturally, Kasenkina's memoir presented her as a heroic freedom seeker."

The consulate, as well as the San Francisco consulate, was closed on 25 August 1948, and on the basis of reciprocity, the Soviet Union ordered that United States consulate in Vladivostok be closed, and plans for a consulate in Leningrad were shelved. Whilst travelling to Gothenburg on the MS Stockholm, Lomakin stated that he would be advising Moscow against the re-establishment of consular relations with the United States.

1974–present
In 1974 the United States and Soviet Union came to an agreement to open consulates in cities in their respective countries; the United States in Kiev and the Soviet Union in New York City. The agreement between the two countries meant that no country could open its consulate before the other. The Soviets completed all renovations to their building within a year of purchase; however, the Americans had not completed the building of their consulate in Kiev. In 1978, whilst waiting for the Americans, the Soviets bought the adjacent building at 11 East 91st Street to utilize for housing.

After the Soviet intervention in Afghanistan, in January 1980 U.S. President Jimmy Carter put an immediate freeze on the consulate program, by withdrawing seven consular officers from Kiev who had been sent to the Ukrainian SSR in advance of the consulate opening, and ordering the expulsion of 17 Soviet diplomats who were to be attached the Soviet consulate in New York City.

The Consulate-General of the Russian Federation in New York City opened to the public on 26 October 1994, and was officially opened on 31 January 1995. The consulate covers the consular region of Connecticut, Maine, Massachusetts, New Hampshire, New Jersey, New York, Pennsylvania, Rhode Island and Vermont.

See also
 The Permanent Mission of the Russian Federation to the United Nations in New York
 Russian Mission School in New York
 Russian Americans in New York City
 Amtorg

References

External links
  Consulate-General of Russia in New York City

1994 establishments in New York City
New York City
Russia
Russian-American culture in New York City
Russia–United States relations
Soviet Union–United States relations